The enzyme DDT-dehydrochlorinase (EC 4.5.1.1) catalyzes the reaction

1,1,1-trichloro-2,2-bis(4-chlorophenyl)ethane  1,1-dichloro-2,2-bis(4-chlorophenyl)ethylene + chloride

This enzyme belongs to the family of lyases, specifically the class of carbon-halide lyases.  The systematic name of this enzyme class is 1,1,1-trichloro-2,2-bis(4-chlorophenyl)ethane chloride-lyase [1,1-dichloro-2,2-bis(4-chlorophenyl)ethylene-forming]. Other names in common use include DDT-ase, 1,1,1-trichloro-2,2-bis(4-chlorophenyl)ethane chloride-lyase, dehydrohalogenase, and DDTase.

References

 
 
 

EC 4.5.1
Enzymes of unknown structure